Upper Tantallon (pronounced 'tan-TAL-en') is a suburban community that extends from the Hammonds Plains Road (Route 213) to the crossroads of Trunk 3 and Route 333 within the Halifax Regional Municipality of Nova Scotia Canada,  west from Downtown Halifax, Nova Scotia, Canada. The community is likely named for Tantallon Castle in Scotland.

Communications
The first three characters of the postal code are B3Z
The Telephone exchange is 902 826,820
Cable Internet access – Eastlink, DSL – Aliant

Statistics
Total Population 3378
Total Dwellings 1528 
Total Land Area – 97.5023 km2

References

External links
Explore HRM

Communities in Halifax, Nova Scotia